Tolentino may refer to:

People
Arturo Tolentino (1910–2004), Filipino politician and diplomat
Francis Tolentino, Filipino politician
Guillermo Tolentino, Filipino sculptor
Jia Tolentino, American writer
José Tolentino (born 1961),  baseball player
José Tolentino de Mendonça (born 1965), Portuguese cardinal of the Catholic Church 
Manny Tolentino, Filipino tennis player
Niccolò da Tolentino (c. 1350–1435), Italian condottiero
Nicholas of Tolentino (c. 1246–1305), Italian saint and mystic
Nicolau Tolentino de Almeida (1740–1811), Portuguese satirical poet
Thomas of Tolentino (c. 1255–1321), medieval Franciscan missionary

Other
Battle of Tolentino, fought from 2–3 May 1815 near Tolentino, Kingdom of Naples 
Tolentino, town and comune in the province of Macerata in the Marche region of central Italy
U.S. Tolentino, Italian association football club located in Tolentino, Marche

See also
 Nicholas of Tolentino (disambiguation)
 Tolentino (surname)

Surnames of Filipino origin